The 1988–89 Courage League National Division Three was the second full season of rugby union within the third tier of the English league system, currently known as National League 1. Each team played one match against the other teams, playing a total of eleven matches each. Plymouth Albion won all their eleven matches and won promotion to National Division Two. Rugby finished second, winning ten of their eleven matches, and were also promoted. Metropolitan Police and Maidstone finished in the bottom two places and both clubs were relegated to Area League South for the following season. Metropolitan Police was relegated on points difference and Maidstone lost all of their matches.

Participating teams and locations

League table

Sponsorship
National Division Three is part of the Courage Clubs Championship and is sponsored by Courage Brewery

See also
 English Rugby Union Leagues
 English rugby union system
 Rugby union in England

References

External links
 National Clubs Association

N3
National League 1 seasons